The British (Open) Tag Team Championship is the top tag team championship contested for throughout the British wrestling circuit. It is currently being contested for in Brian Dixon's All Star Wrestling.

Although the title was created just after the end of regular wrestling coverage on ITV, nonetheless it has changed hands on national UK television, as footage Steve Prince and Vic Powers' victory over Liverpool Lads Robbie Brookside and Doc Dean was included on Brookside's episode of Video Diaries on BBC2 in 1994. Also, author Simon Garfield included a detailed description of Brookside and Dean regaining the titles in Liverpool on 31 March 1995 in his book The Wrestling published by Faber and Faber

Many versions of the British Tag Team Titles exist in the independent circuit of the United Kingdom at any given time but the scene is usually dominated by one companies version. When another company becomes dominant the title often manages to unify itself or is brought into that company.

Current champions
"Chippendale" Mikey Whiplash and new partner, Robbie Dynamite defeated the UK Dream Team (Kid Cool and Dean "2 Xtreme" Allmark) on 25 February 2006 in Staffordshire to win the titles and were defended as recently as April 2009.

Title history

See also

Professional wrestling in the United Kingdom
RBW British Tag Team Championship
RQW/IPW:UK Unified British Tag Team Championship

References

External links
wrestling-titles.com

Tag team wrestling championships
National professional wrestling championships
Professional wrestling in the United Kingdom